Bosten Lake (Uyghur:  /  / Baghrash Köli / Baƣrax Kɵli, Chagatai: Bostang) is a freshwater lake on the northeastern rim of the Tarim Basin, about  east of Yanqi and  northeast of Korla, Xinjiang, China in the Bayin'gholin Mongol Autonomous Prefecture.

The lake's Mongol, Uyghur and Chinese names are sometimes rendered as Bosten Hu, Bagrax-hu, Bagrasch-köl, Baghrasch köl, Bagratsch-kul, Bositeng Lake or Bositeng Hu.

The Kaidu River is the most important tributary to Lake Bosten, accounting for about 83% of its water inflow, other significant tributaries are the Huangshui Ditch, the Qingshui River, and  Wulasite River.

An active fishery exists on the lake. Until the early 1970s, two cyprinid species, Schizothorax biddulphi and Aspiorhynchus laticeps, the latter of which is endemic to Bosten Lake and the Yarkand River, were responsible for 80 percent of the annual catch. During the years 1962 to 1965, various carp species (bighead, black, silver, grass, common, and crucian carp) were introduced into the lake. In the 1970s, these species become major targets of the fishing activities. Since 1978, the introduced European perch has been the dominating species in the catches from Bosten Lake.

References

External links
Google Earth view

Bosten
Lakes of Xinjiang
Sites along the Silk Road